Soul blues is a style of blues music developed in the late 1960s and early 1970s that combines elements of soul music and urban contemporary music.

Origin
African American singers and musicians who grew up listening to the electric blues by artists such as Muddy Waters, Jimmy Reed, and Elmore James, and soul singers such as Sam Cooke, Ray Charles and Otis Redding fused blues and soul music. Bobby Bland was one of the pioneers of this style.

See also
 List of soul-blues musicians
 Soul music
 Blues
 R&B
 Gospel music
 Doo wop
 Funk

References

Soul music genres
Blues music genres